Sir Thomas John Parker,  (born 8 April 1942) is a British businessman. He is chairman of  Laing O'Rourke and former chairman of Pennon Group, a director of Carnival Corporation & plc and lead non-executive director at the Cabinet Office. He has been a director or chairman of numerous other public companies including Airbus, Anglo American plc, Babcock International, British Gas, DP World, Lattice Group, National Grid plc and Ombu Group. He is a past President of the Royal Academy of Engineering, patron at the Centre for Process Innovation and a Visiting Fellow of the University of Oxford.

Early life
Parker was born into a farming family in County Down, Northern Ireland. He attended Belfast College of Technology (since 1991 called Belfast Metropolitan College). In 1958, at age 17, he joined Harland and Wolff as an apprentice naval architect (engineer). At Queen's University Belfast he was awarded an Honorary DSc degree in Mechanical Engineering and Naval Architecture.

Career
 1958–1963 Apprenticeship at Harland & Wolff
 1963–1974 Member of ship design team at Harland & Wolff
 1974–1978 Managing Director of Austin & Pickersgill
 1978–1983 Deputy Chief Executive of board of the British Shipbuilders Corporation
 1983–1993 Chairman and Chief Executive of Harland and Wolff
 1983–1986 Non-Executive Director of Industrial Development Board of Northern Ireland
 1983–1986 Non-Executive Director of British Coal Corporation
 1993–2002 Non-Executive Director of The Royal Navy and Royal Marines Charity
 1993–2000 Chief Executive of Babcock International
 1994–2000 Chairman and Chief Executive of Babcock International
 1997–2000 Non-Executive Director of British Gas
 1999–2003 Chairman of Firth Rixson Limited
 2000–2003 Non-executive director and subsequently deputy chairman of P&O Princess Cruises
 2000–2002 Chairman of Lattice Group
 2000–present Director of Carnival plc
 2001–2003 Non-Executive Director of Brambles
 2002–2005 Chairman of RMC Group
 2002–2011 Chairman of National Grid plc
 2003–present Non-Executive Director of Carnival Corporation
 2005–2006 Chairman of P&O
 2006–2011 Chancellor of the University of Southampton
 2007–2015 Director and vice-chairman of DP World
 2007–2018 Non-executive director of Airbus Group 
 2008 Non-executive chairman of BVT Surface Fleet
 2009–2017 Chairman of Anglo American plc
 2011–2018 Non-executive chairman of Ombu Group
 2011–2014 President of the Royal Academy of Engineering
 2011–2014 Member of the Prime Minister's Committee of Science & Technology
 2015–2020 chairman of Pennon Group
 2017–present chairman of Laing O'Rourke
 2017–present lead non-executive director at the Cabinet Office

The Parker Review 
Between 2016 and 2022, Parker was Chair of the eponymous Parker Review, an independent review which considers how to improve the ethnic and cultural diversity of UK boards to better reflect their employee base and the communities they serve. The first review, published in 2017, set out seven recommendations, including a “One by ‘21” target. Its aim was that all FTSE 100 boards should have at least one director from an ethnic minority background by December 2021. This was a relative success, with 89 FTSE 100 companies and 128 FTSE 250 companies having ethnic minority representation on their boards as of 31 December 2021.

Recognition
He was knighted for services to defence and shipbuilding in 2001. He was the Chancellor of the University of Southampton from 2006 to 2011, as well as being a governor of the Royal National Lifeboat Institution. Other appointments have included membership of the Prime Minister's Business Council for Britain and non-executive director at the Bank of England. He was President of the Royal Institution of Naval Architects from 1996 to 1999. In 2012, he was made a Knight Grand Cross of the Order of the British Empire (GBE), for services to Industry and to the voluntary sector. He was conferred with Honorary Fellowship of the Institution of Engineers and Shipbuilders in Scotland (HonFIES) in 2012. He was elected a Fellow of the Royal Academy of Engineering (FREng) in 1983. He was elected as an Honorary Fellow of the Institution of Engineering and Technology (HonFIET) in 2014.

Personal life
Parker married Emma, a former Latin teacher and pianist, in 1967; they have two children. Parker is a Member of the Royal Yacht Squadron.

References

Further reading
 Autobiography: Parker, Sir John: The View from the Bridge, Endeavour Quill (2018);

External links

Board Profiles:
 Anglo American Chairman Profile
 Ombu Group Chairman Profile
 DP World Vice Chairman Profile
 EADS Director Profile
 Carnival Corporation & plc Director Profile
 Royal Academy of Engineering President Profile
 University of Oxford Visiting Fellow Profile
 Defence Academy

Articles:
 Sir John Parker: how to engineer Britain's industrial revival, The Guardian, 4 June 2012
 Sir John Parker: tough man from the farm, FT.com, 21 April 2011
 Sir John Parker holds the key to tackling Anglo American's weakness, The Guardian, 15 October 2009
 Profile: Sir John Parker, National Grid chairman, The Telegraph, 18 February 2008

1942 births
Living people
British chief executives in the energy industry
Engineers from Belfast
Presidents of the Royal Academy of Engineering
Fellows of the Royal Academy of Engineering
Presidents of the Smeatonian Society of Civil Engineers
Alumni of Queen's University Belfast
People from County Down
Businesspeople from Northern Ireland
Chancellors of the University of Southampton
British naval architects
Knights Bachelor
Knights Grand Cross of the Order of the British Empire